James Doyle may refer to:

The arts
 James Francis Doyle (1840–1913), British architect
 James S. Doyle (born 1935), American journalist
 James William Edmund Doyle (1822–1892), English illustrator and antiquary
 Jimmy Doyle (musician) (1945–2006), Australian guitarist

Politics and public service
 James Doyle (mayor) (1938–2016), mayor of Pawtucket, Rhode Island
 James Doyle (New Brunswick politician), member of the New Brunswick Legislative Assembly
 James Doyle II (born 1972), American state legislator in Rhode Island
 James Edward Doyle (1915–1987), United States federal judge in Wisconsin
 James H. Doyle (1897–1982), admiral in the United States Navy
 James H. Doyle Jr. (1925–2018), admiral in the United States Navy
 Jim Doyle (Canadian politician) (born 1943), politician in British Columbia, Canada
 Jim Doyle (James Edward Doyle, born 1945), former governor of Wisconsin

Sports
 James Doyle (jockey) (born 1988), English flat racing jockey
 James 'Chick' Doyle (1930–1985), Irish badminton player
 Jamie Doyle (footballer, born 1961), Scottish football player (Partick Thistle, Motherwell, Dumbarton)
 Jamie Doyle (footballer, born 1985), Scottish football player
 Jim Doyle (baseball) (1881–1912), American Major League Baseball infielder
 Jimmy Doyle (1939–2015), Irish retired hurler
 Jimmy Doyle (boxer) (1924–1947), American welterweight boxer

Other
 James Doyle (Ferns), Roman Catholic priest; involved in the Ferns Report, an Irish government inquiry
 James Edwin Doyle (1902–1989), advertising entrepreneur
 James Warren Doyle (1786–1834), Irish bishop